Primary is the 2002 debut from New Zealand pop punk band Rubicon. The album was released on 1 August 2002 and peaked at #16 in the New Zealand pop charts.  Seven singles were released off the album, two of which charted: "Bruce" and "Funny Boy".

Track listing

References

External links 
 Album review – NZ Musician magazine
 Album review – NZ Herald

Rubicon (New Zealand band) albums
2002 debut albums